Sulki may refer to:
 Sulki, Masovian Voivodeship, Poland
 Sulki, Podlaskie Voivodeship, Poland
 Sulki (name), Korean given name
 Sulki (village), a village name located in District Sargodha, Punjab, Pakistan

See also
 Sulci, city of ancient Sardinia
 Sulky, kind of lightweight cart